Piperi is a historical tribe (pleme) of Albanian origin and a region in northeastern Montenegro. Piperi is located between the Morača and Zeta rivers up to the northern suburbs of the Montenegrin capital Podgorica.

Origins

Originally an Albanian tribe, the Piperi underwent a process of gradual cultural integration into the neighbouring Slavic population. A Franciscan report of the 17th century illustrates the final stages of their acculturation. Its author writes that the Bratonožići, Piperi, Bjelopavlići and Kuči:" nulla di meno essegno quasi tutti del rito serviano, e di lingua Illrica ponno piu presto dirsi Schiavoni, ch' Albanesi " (since almost all of them use the Serbian rite and the Illyric (Slavic) language, soon they should be called Slavs, rather than Albanians). Historical research has shown that Piperi is not a tribe (pleme) of common patrilineal ancestry. It formed in the period between the mid 15th century and the 16th century by communities that settled in different periods in Piperi, where they also found an already settled population.

History

Ottoman period
Piperi appears in the defter of the Sanjak of Scutari in 1485 and in 1497. The population of Piperi more than doubled from 167 to 347 households from 1485 to 1497. 121 of those households were of unmarried men and 38 of widows. This indicates that many of the newcomers were refugees from areas conquered in Montenegro and northern Albania. In the supplementary defter of 1497, there are several kin groups in the region of Piperi, which appears as a distinct nahiya divided in three timars under local Christian Ottoman spahis. Many communities of the villages of Piperi were categorized as already settled or newcomers from other areas. In the villages, the communities formed clusters of households according to their kinship tries. This separation of settlements by kinship persisted even in the early 20th century. The settlements of Piperi in 1497 were Luška Župa (now Crnci), Drezga, Zavala, Dobriko, Mrke, Hrasnica, Bjelice, Duga, Brestica (river near Spuž), Rječica, Strahalić, Moračice, Radušev Do and Drenovica. Some villages were part of distinct communities, identified as katuns within the defter, those were Katun Bukumir, Katun Bušat (Bushat) and Katun Drenovica. All three katuns were located in the Bratonožići area. The Slavic anthroponymy at that time in Piperi is mainly attributed to the Lužani, while the Albanian anthroponymy to Bukumiri, Bushati and some smaller communities. Other communities like the Macure and the Mataruge had also settled in Piperi. Their traces can be identified mainly within the Lužani whom they had joined by that time in historical record. The toponym Macur jama (pit of Macura) in today's Piperi is linked to them. A part of the people of Piperi have retained in their traditions that before becoming Orthodox they were Catholics.

Piperi was first mentioned in Venetian documents at the beginning of the 15th century. Mariano Bolizza recorded a in 1614 that the Piperi had a total of 270 houses, of Serbian Orthodox faith. In 1613, the Ottomans launched a campaign against the rebel tribes of Montenegro. In response, Piperi along with the tribes of Kuči, Bjelopavlići, Vasojevići, Kastrat, Kelmend, Shkrel and Hot formed a political and military union known as “The Union of the Mountains” or “The Albanian Mountains” .In their shared assemblies, the leaders swore an oath of besa to resist with all their might any upcoming Ottoman expeditions, thereby protecting their self-government and disallowing the establishment of the authority of the Ottoman Spahis in the northern highlands. Their uprising had a liberating character. The 700 men in arms were commanded by Radoslav Božidarov. Giovanni Bembo, the Doge of Venice (1615–1618), had defeated the Serb pirates (Uskoks), whom the Austrians had employed against the Republic of Venice; they were forced to take refuge at Nikšić and Piperi, and established themselves in the villages and tribes, under the later leadership of the Petrović-Njegoš family that held the office of Serbian Orthodox Metropolitan of Cetinje (later Vladika, Prince-Bishop) after 1694. They fought Osman Pasha in 1732, and Mahmut Pasha in 1788. In 1796 they fought Mahmut Pasha again, in the Battle of Martinići (in modern Danilovgrad). They fought Tahir Pasha around 1810.

Prince-Bishop Petar I (r. 1782-1830) waged a successful campaign against the bey of Bosnia in 1819; the repulse of an Ottoman invasion from Albania during the Russo-Turkish War led to the recognition of Montenegrin sovereignty over Piperi. Petar I had managed to unite the Piperi and Bjelopavlići with Old Montenegro. A civil war broke out in 1847, in which the Piperi, Kuci, Bjelopavlici and Crmnica sought to confront the growing centralized power of new prince of Montenegro; the secessionists were subdued and their ringleaders shot. Amid the Crimean War, there was a political problem in Montenegro; Danilo I's uncle, George, urged for yet another war against the Ottomans, but the Austrians advised Danilo not to take arms. A conspiracy was formed against Danilo, led by his uncles George and Pero, the situation came to its height when the Ottomans stationed troops along the Herzegovinian frontier, provoking the mountaineers. Some urged an attack on Bar, others raided into Herzegovina, and the discontent of Danilo's subjects grew so much that the Piperi, Kuči and Bjelopavlići, the recent and still unamalgamated acquisitions, proclaimed themselves an independent state in July, 1854. Danilo was forced to take measurement against the rebels in Brda, some crossed into Turkish territory and some submitted and were to pay for the civil war they had caused.

Petar II Petrović-Njegoš founded the police force (gvardija) throughout the Prince-Bishopric of Montenegro, as part of his transformation from a tribal federation to a proper state; 26 existed in Piperi.

Late modern period
Piperi were one of the tribes that constituted the "Greens" (Zelenaši), a political faction that saw the unification of Montenegro to Serbia in 1918, as the annexation of Montenegro, and instead supported an independent Montenegro. The Greens instigated the Christmas Uprising on January 7, 1919, which was crushed by Serbian troops.

During World War II the majority of the tribe supported the Yugoslav Partisans. The Montenegrin committee of the Yugoslav Communist Party was dominated by Piperi clansmen prior to the war, and they were instigators of the July 1941 uprising. One of the most famous Piperi communists was Dr. Vukasin Markovic, a personal associate to Lenin, who came back after the October revolution from Russia to Montenegro, planning to stage a Soviet revolution. After its failure and his arrest, he fled to the USSR, where he assumed party duties.

Anthropology

Oral tradition
From the 19th century onwards, oral traditions and fragmentary stories were collected by writers and scholars who travelled in the region, about the early history of Piperi. An interdisciplinary and comparative approach of those stories with recorded historical material has yielded more historically-grounded accounts in 20th and 21st centuries.

Johann Georg von Hahn recorded the oral tradition about Piperi's origins in the mid 19th century. The same oral tradition with minor variations is preserved in other communities of the region. According to it the first direct male ancestor of the Triepshi was Ban Keqi son of Keq, a Catholic Albanian who fled from Ottoman conquest and settled in a Slavic-speaking area that would become the historical Piperi region. His sons, Lazër Keqi (ancestor of Hoti)), Ban Keqi (ancestor of Triepshi), Merkota Keqi, Kaster Keqi (ancestor of Krasniqi) and Vas Keqi (ancestor of Vasojevići) had to abandon the village after committing murder against the locals, but Keq and his younger son Piper Keqi remained there and Piper Keqi became the direct ancestor of the Piperi tribe. The name of the first ancestor, Keq, which means bad in Albanian, is given in Malësia to only children or to children from families with very few children (due to infant mortality). In those families, an "ugly" name (i çudun) was given as a spoken talisman to protect the child from the "evil eye. 

About half a century later, the ethnologist Jovan Erdeljanović travelled to the region and made multiple surveys of the tribe in which he recorded many of its customs and traditions. He also collected stories from the members of the tribe, regarding its origins and brotherhoods. According to the oral tradition, after the fall of the Serbian Despotate in the 15th century, one nobleman called Gojko, with his family, left southern Serbia and came to Morača. Four major brotherhoods of the Piperi are said to stem from him: the Đurkovići, Lazarevići, Petrovići and Vukotići. Erdeljanović identified that the oral tradition originated from the Lutovci, the most important part of the tribe, and concluded that they were newcomers who stelled in the area after the fall of the Despotate. Erdeljanović also stated that the four main bratstva (brotherhoods) from the Rogami region, the Rajkovići, Stamatovići, Vučinići and Vukanovići, had become pobratim (blood brothers) and that they all celebrate the slava of Archangel Michael.

Culture
In terms of traditional customs, up to the end of the 19th century, traces of a variant of the northern Albanian kanuns remained in use in Piperi.

In the first half of 20th century, Marie Amelie von Godin, while travelling in Montenegro, reported traces of bilingualism in the area of Piperi. According to her reports, although Albanian was no longer spoken in the area, some laments and oaths were still being sung and recited in Albanian.

Identity
In the 18th century, they were mentioned as a "Serbian Orthodox clan" in a historical and geographical survey from 1757 and a letter sent by the Clan federation to Russia from 1789. Documents, especially the letter of Ivan Radonjić from 1789, show that Montenegrins were then identified as Serbs, while the Banjani, Kuči, Piperi, Bjelopavlići, Zećani, Vasojevići, Bratonožići were not identified as "Montenegrins" but only as Serb tribes. They were all mentioned only in a regional, geographical, and tribal manner, and never as an ethnic category.

However, since the breakup of Yugoslavia, the main part of people living in the Piperi area identify themselves as Montenegrins, with a small majority of them supporting the independence of Montenegro.

Brotherhoods and families

Alagić
Aćimić
Božidarić
Buljević
Banović
Bašanović*
Bešević
Becić
Boljević
Bošković*
Božović
Bracanović
Brković
Živaljević
Žujović
Dakić
Dragićević
Dragišić
Đukić
Đurašević*
Đurović
Filipović
Gegić*
Gligorović
Goričan*
Grubeljić*
Ivanović
Ivančević
Jelenić
Jovanović
Jovović
Kaluđerović
Lakićević
Lakočević
Latković
Plačković
Piper
Lalić*
Ljumović
Makočević
Maudić
Marković
Matanović
Matović
Mijović
Miličković
Milićević
Milunović
Nikolić
Novaković
Novićević
Hot
Hotić
Otović
Hotović
Olević
Pajić
Petrović
Piletić
Piperović
Piperski
Popović
Pulević
Radević
Radonjić
Radovanović
Radunović*
Rajković
Raslović*
Ristović
Savović
Simović
Stanić*
Stojanović
Todorović
Tiodorović
Šćepanović
Šušović
Šujak
Vučinić
Vujović*
Vukanović
Vukotić
Šćekić
Vuletić*
Vuljević*
Vulikić
Vušutović*
Ćetković
Ćosić

Notable people
Uzun Mirko Apostolović, was a Serbian voivode (military commander), with the bimbaša rank during the Serbian revolution.
Tanasko Rajić, Serbian vojvoda (commander) and revolutionary.
Arso Jovanović, Yugoslav Partisan commander during World War II
Blažo Jovanović, Yugoslav communist and president of Montenegro
Savić Marković Štedimlija, pro-Croatian Montenegrin ideologist and Ustasha regime collaborator
Milutin Vučinić, Prime Minister of the Kingdom of Montenegro in Exile
Boro Vučinić, Montenegrin politician and former defense minister
Ivan Milutinović, (1901—1944) was a Yugoslav partisan general who died during World War II in Yugoslavia.
Mladen Žujović, member of Konspiracija
Sreten Žujović, Serbian and Yugoslav politician
Jovan Žujović, Serbian anthropologist.
Milo Milunović, notable Yugoslav painter.
Tomislav Nikolić, former President of Serbia
Jevrem Brković, Montenegrin writer
Balša Brković, Montenegrin writer, son of Jevrem
 Veselin Vukotić, Montenegrin economist, professor, politician, and university rector

See also
Stephen of Piperi, Serbian saint
Piperi, a settlement in Bosnia and Herzegovina

References

Sources

Historical regions in Montenegro
States and territories established in the 15th century
States and territories disestablished in the 19th century
Prince-Bishopric of Montenegro
Tribes of Montenegro
Montenegrin people of Albanian descent